William Hey may refer to:
 William Hey (surgeon) (1736–1819), English surgeon
 William Hey (Chief Justice) (c. 1733–1797), Chief Justice of Quebec and Member of Parliament for Sandwich
 William Hey (priest) (1811–1882), Archdeacon of Cleveland